Georges Pierre Joseph Thibaut (25 November 1920 – 10 November 2018) was a Belgian chess player, Belgian Chess Championship medalist (1951, 1952, 1953).

Biography
Georges Pierre Thibaut was one of Belgium's leading chess players form the end of 1940s to the early 1960s. He participated in all the Belgian Chess Championships from 1948 up to 1961. Georges Pierre Thibaut won in this tournaments three bronze medal in row: in 1951, 1952, and in 1953.

Georges Pierre Thibaut played for Belgium in the Chess Olympiads:
 In 1950, at fourth board in the 9th Chess Olympiad in Dubrovnik (+5, =4, -5),
 In 1954, at second reserve board in the 11th Chess Olympiad in Amsterdam (+2, =4, -4),
 In 1956, at fourth board in the 12th Chess Olympiad in Moscow (+4, =4, -5),
 In 1960, at second board in the 14th Chess Olympiad in Leipzig (+2, =7, -5).

In 1961, after a traffic accident, he stopped participating in chess tournaments.

References

External links

Georges Pierre Thibaut chess games at 365chess.com

1920 births
2018 deaths
Belgian chess players
Chess Olympiad competitors
20th-century chess players